The 2007 FIFA Club World Cup (officially known as the FIFA Club World Cup Japan 2007 presented by Toyota for sponsorship reasons) was a football tournament played in Japan from 7 to 16 December 2007. It was the fourth FIFA Club World Cup, a tournament organised by FIFA for the winners of each confederation's top continental club tournament.

Seven teams from the six confederations entered the tournament; Defending champions Internacional did not qualify as they were eliminated in the second stage of the 2007 Copa Libertadores. 

Italian side Milan became the first European team to win the Club World Cup with a 4–2 victory over Argentinian club Boca Juniors in the final. That title made them the most successful team in the world in terms of international trophies won (18).

Host bids
The FIFA Executive Committee appointed Japan as hosts of the 2007 tournament on 15 September 2006 during their meeting in Zürich, Switzerland.

Qualified teams

The qualified teams were decided during 2007 through the six major continental competitions. The winner of each regional club championship participated in the 2007 Club World Cup. In March 2007, the FIFA executive committee introduced a qualifying playoff between the 2007 OFC Champions League champion and the host nation's 2007 J. League champion, as opposed to previous years, in which the Oceania champions were given direct entry into the tournament. In order to avoid the participation of two teams from the same country, the best-placed non-Japanese team in the AFC Champions League would take the "host" berth if a Japanese team won that competition, which indeed happened as Urawa Red Diamonds won the 2007 AFC Champions League. Also, the fifth-place match was eliminated for this edition.

It was the first participation in the FIFA Club World Cup for all seven teams that qualified.

Notes

Venues
Tokyo, Yokohama and Toyota were the three cities to serve as venues for the 2007 FIFA Club World Cup.

Squads
For a list of all the squads of this tournament, see the article 2007 FIFA Club World Cup squads.

Match officials

Matches

All times local (UTC+9)

Play-off for quarter-finals

Quarter-finals

Semi-finals

Match for third place

Final

Goalscorers

1 own goal
 Massimo Ambrosini (Milan, against Boca Juniors)

2 own goals
 Hadi Aghili (Sepahan, against Waitakere United and Urawa Red Diamonds)

Awards

References

External links
FIFA Club World Cup Japan 2007, FIFA.com
2007 FIFA Club World Cup Official Site (Archived)
FIFA Technical Report

 
2007
2007
2007 in association football
2007 in Japanese football
2007–08 in New Zealand association football
2007–08 in Argentine football
2007–08 in Italian football
2007–08 in Tunisian football
2007–08 in Mexican football
2007–08 in Iranian football